Una mujer en la calle is a 1955 Mexican crime film directed by Alfredo B. Crevenna.

Cast 
 Marga López - Lucero / Alicia
 Prudencia Grifell - Nena
 Ernesto Alonso - Jose Luis
 José María Linares-Rivas - Carlos 
 Raúl Ramírez - Fernando
 Leonor Llausás - Natalia
 Amparo Villegas - Isabel
 Rosa Elena Durgel - Eugenia
 Lupe Carriles - Raquel
 Rosa María Moreno - Prostituta

References

External links 

1955 crime films
1955 films
Mexican crime films
Mexican black-and-white films
1950s Mexican films